Myrovernix is a genus of flowering plants belonging to the family Asteraceae.

Its native range is South Africa.

Species
Species:

Myrovernix glandulosus 
Myrovernix gnaphaloides 
Myrovernix intricata 
Myrovernix longifolius 
Myrovernix scaber

References

Gnaphalieae
Asteraceae genera